Parliamentary elections were held in the Faroe Islands on 17 November 1990.

Results

Elections in the Faroe Islands
Faroes
1990 in the Faroe Islands
November 1990 events in Europe